Brassica arvensis can refer to:

Brassica arvensis Hablitz, a synonym of Brassica rapa L.
Brassica arvensis L., a synonym of Moricandia arvensis (L.) DC., purple mistress
Brassica arvensis (L.) Rabenh., a synonym of Sinapis arvensis L., field mustard